Anarsia eleagnella is a moth of the family Gelechiidae. It is found in Hungary, Romania, Ukraine, Russia, Transcaucasia, Turkmenistan, Kazakhstan and Afghanistan.

The larvae feed on Elaeagnus species.

References

Moths described in 1957
eleagnella
Moths of Europe
Moths of Asia